Haunted Cities is the second studio album by the American punk rock/hip hop band Transplants. It was released on June 21, 2005 via LaSalle Records/Atlantic Records, and sold close to 34,000 copies in its first week and came in at #28 on the US Billboard 200, #72 on the UK Albums Chart, #140 on the Top 200 Albums France.

Production
Audio production of the record was handled by Tim Armstrong and Dave Carlock. Rancid's Matt Freeman, The Slackers' Vic Ruggiero, Cypress Hill's B-Real and Sen Dog, Dilated Peoples' Rakaa, and Boo-Yaa T.R.I.B.E. made their appearances on the album as additional musicians and vocalists. Houston-based rapper Paul Wall made screwed and chopped version of the album, released months later the same year.

Background
The album spawned three singles: "Gangsters and Thugs", "What I Can't Describe" and "Crash and Burn". Its lead single, "Gangsters and Thugs", peaked at #25 on the US Alternative Songs and #35 on the UK Singles Chart. It also included two bonus tracks: "Red Dawn", which was previously released as B-side of CD formatted "Gangsters and Thugs" single and was added later on as the thirteenth track on the Japanese version of Haunted Cities, and "1, 2, 3, 4, 5, 6, 7", which was dropped as non-album promotional single and was added later as the thirteenth track on its Best Buy edition.

Critical reception

Haunted Cities was met with "mixed or averages" reviews from critics. At Metacritic, which assigns a weighted average rating out of 100 to reviews from mainstream publications, this release received an average score of 55 based on 11 reviews.

In a review for AllMusic, Johnny Loftus noted how the album "suffers lyrically", while going on to say, "the whole package ends up having this strangely alluring glimmer. It's like discovering California Babylon after being lost in suburbia." E! Online explained: "Haunted Cities has more of a street-smarts vibe and is actually more listenable. Despite some song titles that foreshadow darker themes, this musical locale is more inviting than intimidating."

Track listing

Personnel

 Tim Armstrong - vocals, bass, guitar, keyboards, synthesizer, executive producer, producer, engineering
 Rob "Skinhead Rob" Aston - vocals
 Travis Barker - drums, loops, percussion
 Sen Dog - vocals (track 1)
 Paul Devoux - vocals (track 4)
 Vincent Devoux - vocals (track 4)
 Ted Devoux - vocals (track 4)
 Loius Freese - vocals (track 6)
 Rakaa Taylor - vocals (track 12)
 Richard Stites - backing vocals (track 3)
 Dave Carlock - backing vocals (tracks: 4, 8, 12), bass (tracks: 5, 12), guitar (tracks: 5-6, 8), keyboards & synthesizer (tracks: 2-8, 12), theremin (tracks: 1, 6, 8), organ (tracks: 8, 10), producer, engineering
 Kim Jade Fry - bass (tracks: 2-3)
 Matt Freeman - bass (tracks: 5, 11)
 Gemi Taylor - guitar (track 4)
 Nic C - drum programming (track 7)
 Carlos Paugar - drum programming (track 12)
 Vic Ruggiero - Farfisa organ & Wurlitzer organ (track 6)
 Jennifer Tefft - flute (track 12)
 Dave Holden - saxophone (track 5)
 Obi Fernandez - trombone (track 5)
 Rich Graiko - trumpet (track 5)
 Scott Abels - percussion (tracks: 4, 6, 10, 12)
 Brett Reed - percussion (track 10)
 DJ Odie - scratches (tracks: 3, 11-12)
 DJ Pone - scratches (tracks: 4-5, 10)
 Billy "Jam" Kiernan - sound fx effects (track 5)
 John Silas Cranfield - assistant engineering
 Nick Ferrero - assistant engineering
 Chris Rakestraw - assistant engineering
 Alicia Simmons - assistant engineering
 Ian Suddarth - assistant engineering
 John Morrical - additional engineer, assistant engineering
 Fredrik Sarhagen - additional engineering
 Brian "Big Bass" Gardner - mastering
 Neal Harrington Pogue - mixing
 Mark Machado - artwork (logo & cover)
 Estevan Oriol - photography

Charts 

Album

Singles

References

External links 

2005 albums
Atlantic Records albums
Transplants (band) albums